Ramazan Abdulaev (born 30 April 1998) is a Russian judoka. He is the silver medallist in the -60 kg at the 2021 Judo Grand Slam Paris

At the 2021 Judo Grand Slam Abu Dhabi held in Abu Dhabi, United Arab Emirates, he won the silver medal in his event.

References

External links
 

1998 births
Living people
Russian male judoka
21st-century Russian people